Komsomolsky is a rural locality (a settlement) in Sovetskoye Rural Settlement, Kalachyovsky District, Volgograd Oblast, Russia. The population was 1,224 as of 2010. There are 33 streets.

Geography 
Komsomolsky is located 30 km east of Kalach-na-Donu (the district's administrative centre) by road. Prikanalny is the nearest rural locality.

References 

Rural localities in Kalachyovsky District